Jacques Freitag (born 11 June 1982) is a South African high jumper. He is one of only ten athletes (along with Valerie Adams, Usain Bolt, Veronica Campbell-Brown, Yelena Isinbayeva, Kirani James, Jana Pittman, Dani Samuels, David Storl and Faith Kipyegon) to win world championships at the youth, junior, and senior level of an athletic event.

Freitag grew up in Bronkhorstspruit, Gauteng (50 km east of Pretoria). His mother, Hendrina Pieters, was in 1973 a South African high jump champion with a personal best of 1.74 metres.

Competition record

Awards
2003 University of Pretoria Sportsman of the year

Education
He was in Erasmus hoërskool in Bronkhorstspruit then he attended Afrikaanse Hoër Seunskool (Afrikaans High School for Boys, also known as Affies), a public school located in Pretoria.

References

External links

1982 births
Living people
Afrikaner people
South African male high jumpers
Athletes (track and field) at the 2004 Summer Olympics
Olympic athletes of South Africa
University of Pretoria alumni
World Athletics Championships medalists
World Athletics Championships winners
Athletes (track and field) at the 1999 All-Africa Games
African Games competitors for South Africa
Sportspeople from the Northern Cape
Sportspeople from Gauteng